John Ross (February 24, 1770 in Solebury, Bucks County, Pennsylvania – January 31, 1834 in Easton, Northampton County, Pennsylvania), was a Representative to the U.S. Congress from Pennsylvania.

Ross studied law in West Chester, Pennsylvania. He was admitted to the bar in 1792 and engaged in practice in Easton, Pennsylvania.  He served as a member of the Pennsylvania State House of Representatives in 1800.  He was clerk of the orphans’ court and recorder from 1800 to 1803, county register from 1800 to 1809, and burgess of Easton in 1804.

Ross was elected as a Republican to the Eleventh Congress.  He was again elected to the Fourteenth and Fifteenth Congresses.  He resigned in 1818 to become president judge of the seventh judicial district of the State.  He was transferred to the State supreme bench in 1830 and served until his death.

Ross was married to Mary Ross (1774–1845); they were the parents of Thomas Ross, another congressman. He was buried in a private cemetery on the family estate, "Ross Common Manor", Ross Township, Pennsylvania. He was buried next to his wife.

Ross Common Manor was added to the National Register of Historic Places in 1978.

Sources

 
 The Political Graveyard

1770 births
1834 deaths
Members of the Pennsylvania House of Representatives
Pennsylvania state court judges
People from Bucks County, Pennsylvania
Democratic-Republican Party members of the United States House of Representatives from Pennsylvania